Jefferson County is located in the north central portion of the U.S. state of Kentucky. As of the 2020 census, the population was 782,969. It is the most populous county in the commonwealth (with more than twice the population of second ranked Fayette County).

Since a city-county merger in 2003, the county's territory, population and government have been coextensive with the city of Louisville, which also serves as county seat. The administrative entity created by this merger is the Louisville/Jefferson County Metro Government, abbreviated to Louisville Metro.

Jefferson County is the anchor of the Louisville-Jefferson County, KY-IN Metropolitan Statistical Area, locally referred to as Kentuckiana.

History

Jefferson County—originally Jefferson County, Virginia—was established by the Virginia General Assembly in June 1780, when it abolished and partitioned Kentucky County into three counties: Fayette, Jefferson and Lincoln. Named for Thomas Jefferson, who was governor of Virginia at the time, it was one of Kentucky's nine original counties on June 1, 1792.

In 1778, during the American Revolutionary War, George Rogers Clark's militia and 60 civilian settlers, established the first American settlement in the county on Corn Island in the Ohio River, at head of the Falls of the Ohio. They moved to the mainland the following year, establishing Louisville.

Richard Mentor Johnson, the 9th Vice President of the United States, was born in Jefferson County in 1780, while the family was living in a settlement along the Beargrass Creek.

The last major American Indian raid in present-day Jefferson County was the Chenoweth Massacre on July 17, 1789.

Government
Whenever possible, the metro government generally avoids any self-reference including the name "Jefferson County" and has even renamed the Jefferson County Courthouse as Metro Hall.

Prior to the 2003 merger, the head of local government was the County Judge/Executive, a post that still exists but now has few powers. The office is currently held by Queenie Averette.

Local government is effectively now led by the Mayor of Louisville Metro, Craig Greenberg.

Geography
The Ohio River forms its northern boundary with the state of Indiana.

The highest point is South Park Hill, elevation , located in the southern part of the county. The lowest point is  along the Ohio River just north of West Point.

Adjacent counties

 Bullitt County (south)
 Shelby County (east)
 Oldham County (northeast)
 Spencer County (southeast)
 Hardin County (southwest)
 Clark County, Indiana (north)
 Harrison County, Indiana (west)
 Floyd County, Indiana (northwest)

Infrastructure

Major highways

Demographics

As of the census of 2000, there were 693,604 people, 287,012 households, and 183,113 families residing in the county. The racial makeup of the county was 77.38% White, 18.88% Black or African American, 0.22% Native American, 1.39% Asian, 0.04% Pacific Islander, 0.68% from other races, and 1.42% from two or more races. 1.78% of the population were Hispanic or Latino of any race.

There were 287,012 households, out of which 29.60% had children under the age of 18 living with them, 45.20% were married couples living together, 14.70% had a female householder with no husband present, and 36.20% were non-families. 30.50% of all households were made up of individuals, and 10.30% had someone living alone who was 65 years of age or older. The average household size was 2.37 and the average family size was 2.97.

In the county, the population was spread out, with 24.30% under the age of 18, 8.90% from 18 to 24, 30.40% from 25 to 44, 22.80% from 45 to 64, and 13.50% who were 65 years of age or older. The median age was 37 years. For every 100 females, there were 91.60 males. For every 100 females age 18 and over, there were 87.60 males.

The median income for a household in the county was $54,357 (2018), and the median income for a family was $49,161 (2005). Males had a median income of $36,484 versus $26,255 for females (2005). The per capita income for the county was $31,980 (2018). About 14.8% of the population were below the poverty line, including 22.1% of those under age 18 and 8.2% of those age 65 or over (2018).

Communities

Since the formation of Louisville Metro on January 6, 2003, residents of the cities below also became citizens of the newly expanded Metro, but none of the incorporated places dissolved in the process. The functions formerly served by the county government for the towns were assumed by Louisville Metro. However, the former City of Louisville was effectively absorbed into the new city-county government.

 Anchorage
 Audubon Park
 Bancroft
 Barbourmeade
 Beechwood Village
 Bellemeade
 Bellewood
 Blue Ridge Manor
 Briarwood
 Broad Fields
 Broeck Pointe
 Brownsboro Farm
 Brownsboro Village
 Buechel †
 Cambridge
 Cherrywood Village
 Coldstream
 Creekside
 Crossgate
 Douglass Hills
 Druid Hills
 Fairdale †
 Fairmeade
 Fern Creek †
 Fincastle
 Fisherville
 Forest Hills
 Glenview Hills
 Glenview Manor
 Glenview
 Goose Creek
 Graymoor-Devondale
 Green Spring
 Heritage Creek
 Hickory Hill
 Highview †
 Hills and Dales
 Hollow Creek
 Hollyvilla
 Houston Acres
 Hurstbourne Acres
 Hurstbourne
 Indian Hills
 Jeffersontown
 Keeneland
 Kingsley
 Langdon Place
 Lincolnshire
 Louisville
 Lyndon
 Lynnview
 Manor Creek
 Maryhill Estates
 Meadow Vale
 Meadowbrook Farm
 Meadowview Estates
 Middletown
 Mockingbird Valley
 Moorland
 Murray Hill
 Newburg †
 Norbourne Estates
 Northfield
 Norwood
 Okolona †
 Old Brownsboro Place
 Parkway Village
 Penile
 Plantation
 Pleasure Ridge Park †
 Plymouth Village
 Poplar Hills
 Prospect
 Richlawn
 Riverwood
 Rolling Fields
 Rolling Hills
 Seneca Gardens
 Shively
 South Park View
 Spring Mill
 Spring Valley
 Springlee
 St. Dennis †
 St. Matthews
 St. Regis Park
 Strathmoor Manor
 Strathmoor Village
 Sycamore
 Ten Broeck
 Thornhill
 Valley Station †
 Watterson Park
 Wellington
 West Buechel
 Westwood
 Whipps Millgate
 Wildwood
 Windy Hills
 Woodland Hills
 Woodlawn Park
 Worthington Hills

† Formerly a census-designated place in the county, but, in 2003, these places became neighborhoods within the city limits of Louisville Metro.

Politics

Jefferson County has voted for the Democratic candidate in every presidential election since 1992. In the 2019 gubernatorial election, it voted for Democrat Andy Beshear by a higher percentage than any other county in Kentucky, giving him 67% of the vote.

Education
The public school districts for the county are: Jefferson County School District (JCPS) and Anchorage Independent School District. The Anchorage district only covers grades K-8; Anchorage district residents may attend JCPS or Oldham County Schools.

Kentucky School for the Blind, a state-operated school, is in Louisville.

See also

 Jefferson County Public Schools
 Jefferson County Sunday School Association
 Louisville/Jefferson County metro government (balance), Kentucky
 National Register of Historic Places listings in Jefferson County, Kentucky

References

External links

 Jefferson County Clerks Office
 Jefferson County Sheriff's Office
 Louisville/Jefferson County Information Consortium
 Louisville Metro

 
Kentucky counties
1780 establishments in Virginia
Kentucky counties on the Ohio River
Louisville metropolitan area
Populated places established in 1780
Former counties of Virginia